Tregolls is a farm in the parish of St Wenn and one mile northeast of the village of St Wenn in mid Cornwall, England, UK.

See also

 List of farms in Cornwall

References

Farms in Cornwall